The Anglican Church of St Andrew Compton Dundon, Somerset, England was built in the 14th century. It is a Grade II* listed building.

History

The chancel of the church was built in the 14th century with the rest being added in the 15th. Restoration was carried out around 1900.

The parish is part of the benefice of Street with Walton and Compton Dundon within the Diocese of Bath and Wells.

Architecture

The stone building has hamstone dressings and clay tile roofs. It consists of a four-bay nave and two-bay chancel with and south porch and north east vestry. The three-stage west tower is supported by corner buttresses. The bells in the tower were rehung in 1936.

The interior includes a 14th-century piscina and an octagonal timber pulpit dating from 1628. There are two chests one from the 14th and the other 16th century.

In the churchyard is an ancient yew tree, assessed as being over 1700 years old.

There is also an 18th-century chest tomb.

See also  
 List of ecclesiastical parishes in the Diocese of Bath and Wells

References

Grade II* listed buildings in South Somerset
Grade II* listed churches in Somerset
Church of England church buildings in South Somerset